Malcolm Lee may refer to:
Malcolm D. Lee, American actor, film director, and screenwriter
Malcolm Lee (basketball), American basketball player
Malcolm Lee (judge), former Federal Court of Australia judge

See also
Malcolm Leigh, director, see Games That Lovers Play